The following are statistics relating to the COVID-19 pandemic in Ontario.

New cases (2020)

New cases (2021)

New cases (2022)

Confirmed deaths (2020)

Confirmed deaths (2021)

Confirmed deaths (2022)

Active cases (2020)

Active cases (2021)

Active cases (2022)

Geographical distribution 

Updated as of January 16, 2022

Demographic distribution 

Updated as of August 10, 2021

Ontario public school and childcare centre statistics 

Data as of December 24, 2021

References 

Ontario
COVID-19 pandemic
Disasters in Ontario
Health in Ontario
Ontario
2021 in Ontario
Ontario